Jessica Falkholt (15 May 1988 – 17 January 2018) was an Australian actress who appeared in the television series Home and Away as Hope Morrison from September to November 2016. Along with her parents and sister, she died as a result of a December 2017 traffic collision in southern New South Wales. She appeared posthumously playing the title role in the 2018 fantasy thriller film Harmony, released 10 months after her death.

Biography
Falkholt was born on 15 May 1988 in Sydney to an Italian mother, Vivian and Swedish father Lars. She attended Gilroy College in Castle Hill, and was awarded the Higher School Certificate in 2006. She obtained a Bachelor of Arts in Media and Communication at the University of New South Wales, where she starred in several theatrical productions including the musical Cabaret. After graduation, she worked production jobs at Channel Seven and Carnival Films, building a portfolio by acting in television commercials.

In 2012, Falkholt was accepted into the National Institute of Dramatic Art (NIDA). While studying there, she had minor television roles in Tricky Business and Underbelly: Badness. Falkholt graduated from NIDA in 2015, and the following year took on a recurring role in series Home and Away as Hope Morrison. In 2017 she completed work on her first feature film, Harmony, released after her death in October 2018, in which she played the titular character. She also filmed a guest role in Nine Network's drama Bite Club. Shortly before the accident, Falkholt finished filming the role of Genevieve in crime drama Mystery Road.

Traffic collision
On 26 December 2017, Falkholt was involved in a car crash which killed both her parents instantly. As the vehicle burst into flames, both Jessica and her sister Annabelle, aged 21, were pulled out of the vehicle alive, but Annabelle died on 29 December in Liverpool Hospital. The 50-year-old driver of the other vehicle, who was also killed, was reportedly a serial traffic offender. His car failed to negotiate a curve on the Princes Highway, near Sussex Inlet, and travelled into the path of the Falkholts' car. The Falkholts were returning to Ryde after attending Christmas celebrations. Officials confirmed the other driver was returning home to Ulladulla, after visiting a methadone clinic in Nowra. Police are investigating whether the drug was a factor in the crash, among other contributing factors.

Following the crash, Falkholt was taken to Sydney's St George Hospital, where she underwent surgery that included the removal of a kidney and part of her skull. On 12 January 2018, a spokesperson for St George Hospital confirmed that her life support had been turned off. She died in hospital on 17 January 2018, aged 29.

Roles

Television
Home and Away (2016) – Hope Morrison
Bite Club (2018) – Emma Bailey
Mystery Road (2018) – Genevieve Leclaire

Film
Harmony (2018) – Harmony

References

External links

1988 births
2018 deaths
Actresses from Sydney
Road incident deaths in New South Wales
Australian people of Italian descent
Australian people of Swedish descent